Wars (also known as War and Warsz) and Sawa are legendary characters from the origin myth of the founding and etymology of the city of Warsaw, capital of Poland. There are several versions of the legend with their appearance.

In legend 
According to one version of the legend, the duke or king called Kazimierz (Casimir), sometimes also identified as duke Siemowit I of Masovia, got lost in the forest, in where now is Warsaw Old Town located, while hunting. He got to the small adobe hut, inhabited by a woman who recently gave birth to twins. The woman hosted him very generously. He named two kids Wars and Sawa, and gave a woman money to build a bigger house. Later, other people moved near the house, forming a settlement, which got named after the twins, Warsawa, which later evolved to Warszawa, the name of the city of Warsaw in Polish language. According to a different version of the legend, Wars and Sawa were married couples instead, who lived in that house, and who hosted the duke.

According to a different version of the legend, Sawa was a mermaid living in the Vistula river with whom a fisherman named Wars fell in love.

In yet another version of the legend, Wars and Sawa were brothers, who were fishermen living near modern Warsaw Old Town.

Citations

References

Bibliography 
 Anna Marta Zdanowska, Julia Odnous: Legendy warszawskie. Antologia. Warsaw: Museum of Warsaw, 2016, ISBN 978-83-62189-80-9.
 Encyklopedia Warszawy. Warsaw: Wydawnictwo Naukowe PWN, 1994, ISBN 83-01-08836-2.
 Franciszek Galiński: Gawędy o Warszawie. Warsaw: Instytut Wydawniczy Biblioteka Polska, 1939.
 Encyklopedia Warszawy. Warsaw, Państwowy Instytut Wydawniczy, 1975.
 Anna Wilczyńska: Wielka księga legend Warszawy. Warsaw: Skarpa Warszawska, 2017. ISBN 978-83-63842-42-0.

Legendary Polish people
History of Warsaw
Origin myths
Mermaids
Fictional fishers
Brother duos
Fictional twins
Fictional duos
Fictional couples